Instant payment (sometimes referred to as real-time payment or faster payment) is a method of exchanging money and processing payments, allowing for almost immediate transfer of money between bank accounts, instead of the more typical one to three business days.

Many countries have implemented instant payment systems, and many instant payment systems and platforms are currently under development worldwide, due to increased need for faster and reliable transactions.

The Euro Retail Payments Board (ERPB) define instant payments as:

Background 
The growth of e-commerce has caused changes in people's spending patterns. Shopping is no longer confined to regular business hours, creating new challenges for funds transfers. 
Similarly, merchants require faster and more reliable money transfer systems to keep up with consumers' demands.

Traditional electronic payments like simple bank transfers, that perform the electronic funds transfer within few business days, are not in line with user expectations. 
It is predicted that, in the next year, instant payments will become the standard for electronic fund transfers, where customers will be able to digitally access their insurers and manage their funds.

Examples

See also
 European Central Bank
 EBA Clearing
 SWIFT for NPP

References

Securities clearing and depository institutions
Payment networks
Payment systems